Michael Rothschild (born August 2, 1942, in Chicago, Illinois, United States) is an American economist; he is visiting professor at the Department of Economics of the University of California in Los Angeles (UCLA) and a former dean at Princeton.

Education 
Rothschild holds a Bachelor of Arts in anthropology from Reed College (1963), and a Master of Arts in international relations from Yale University (1965). He earned his Doctor of Philosophy in economics from the Massachusetts Institute of Technology (1969).

Honors 
Rothschild has achieved a plethora or recognition through his time in academia and beyond. He is a fellow of the American Academy of Arts and Sciences, the American Association of the Advancement of Science, and the Econometric Society.

Academic career 
He was the William Stuart Tod Professor of Economics and Public Affairs, Emeritus at the Woodrow Wilson School of Public and International Affairs. He was dean of the Woodrow Wilson School of Public and International Affairs at Princeton University from 1995 through 2001. Rothschild has written on asymmetric information, decision-making under uncertainty, demography, investment, taxation, finance, and jury-decision processes.

He co-authored one of the most important papers in economics, Equilibrium in Competitive Insurance Markets: An Essay on the Economics of Imperfect Information, with Joseph Stiglitz. This paper gives the first systematic exposition of the problem of cherry picking when insurance companies compete for customers. In Increasing Risk I: A definition, Rothschild and Stiglitz introduced the important decision theory concept of the mean-preserving spread, which leads to a partial ordering of probability distributions according to degree of risk.

Not only has he written on insurance, but also asymmetric information, demography, investment, taxation, finance among others. In addition, he coedited Studies of Supply and Demand in Higher Education. It highlights the presence of competition, use of resources, decision-making in education regarding higher education.

Most notably he wrote about decision-making under uncertainty through, 'Uncertainty in Economics: Readings and Exercises,'' with Peter Diamond. This book synthesizes the traditional and modern thought associated with economic uncertainty. It provides understanding into three primary groups: theory of choice under uncertainty, general equilibrium models of financial institutions, and models of the effects of uncertainty on market institutions.

References

External links 
 Official homepage at UCLA, CV
 Website at Princeton

1942 births
Living people
21st-century American economists
Reed College alumni
Yale University alumni
MIT School of Humanities, Arts, and Social Sciences alumni
Princeton University faculty
Fellows of the Econometric Society
Fellows of the American Academy of Arts and Sciences
Distinguished Fellows of the American Economic Association